Lena Sandlin-Hedman (born 1969) is a Swedish politician and former member of the Riksdag, the national legislature. A member of the Social Democratic Party, she represented Västerbotten County between October 1994 and September 2004. She quit politics in 2004 after claiming she had been bullied by party colleagues. She is the daughter of ice hockey coach Tommy Sandlin.

References

1969 births
20th-century Swedish women politicians
21st-century Swedish women politicians
Living people
Members of the Riksdag 1994–1998
Members of the Riksdag 1998–2002
Members of the Riksdag 2002–2006
Members of the Riksdag from the Social Democrats
Women members of the Riksdag